Leptostiba is a genus of rove beetles, described in 1985 by the Italian entomologist, Roberto Pace.

References
 Roberto Pace, 1985. Aleocharinae attere della regione australiana e neozelandese raccolte dal Prof. Franz (Coleoptera, Staphylinidae). Fragmenta entomologica 18 (1): 105–114. [In Italian with English summary.] Full issue (zip-compressed PDF)

Aleocharinae genera